The Electoral district of Frankston North was an electoral district of the Legislative Assembly in the Australian state of Victoria. It was formed in 1985 when population increases in the Frankston area saw the Electoral district of Frankston divided into Frankston North and Frankston South, but absorbed back into Frankston in 1992.

Members

Election results

References

Former electoral districts of Victoria (Australia)
1985 establishments in Australia
1992 disestablishments in Australia
Constituencies established in 1985
Constituencies disestablished in 1992